The Pascagoula-Gautier School District is a public school system based in Pascagoula, Mississippi.

It includes Pascagoula and most of Gautier.

Schools

Pascagoula
High School (Grades 9–12)

 Gautier High School
Pascagoula High School
Middle Schools (Grades 5–8)
Colmer Middle School (Grades 7–8)
Trent Lott Academy (Grades 5–6)
Elementary Schools (Grades PreK-4)
Arlington Elementary
Beach Elementary
Central Elementary
Cherokee Elementary
Eastlawn Elementary
Jackson Elementary
Lake Elementary

Gautier
High School (Grades 9–12)
Gautier High School - Opened in 1997

Middle Schools (Grades 5–8)
Gautier Middle School (Grades 7–8)
Singing River Academy (Grades 5–6)

Elementary Schools (Grades PreK-4)
College Park Elementary
Gautier Elementary
Martin Bluff Elementary

District Campuses
Jackson County Exceptional School
Opportunity Center
College & Career Technical Institute (Grades 9–12)

History

Integration 
Prior to integration, Pascagoula High School, then located on Pascagoula Street, served the white students of Pascagoula and Gautier. Carver High School, previously named Pascagoula Negro High School, served the black students. When the schools were integrated in 1970, all high school students attended Pascagoula High School. The old Pascagoula High School campus closed in 1997. In 2010, the old school was repurposed as a retirement home after extensive renovations that preserved the architectural features of the building.

New High Schools 
From 1970 to 1997, all students from both Pascagoula and Gautier in grades 10-12 attended Pascagoula High School. Sometime before 1989, 10th graders began to be housed at what was known as “The Annex” in the former Carver High School building due to the limited capacity of the old Pascagoula High School. Gautier students in grades K-9 attended schools within the city of Gautier. 9th graders in both cities attended Pascagoula Junior High School, Colmer Junior High School (also in Pascagoula), and Gautier Junior High School.

In 1997, the school district built two new high schools: one for Pascagoula and one for Gautier. This would be the first time that Gautier had its own high school.

Middle School Reconfigurations 
In 2009, Trent Lott Middle School and Colmer Middle School merged. All Pascagoula 6th graders attended Trent Lott 6th Grade Academy in the former Trent Lott Middle School building. Pascagoula 7th and 8th graders now attended Colmer Middle School. After renovations to Trent Lott Academy in 2011, Pascagoula 5th graders now attend Trent Lott Academy as well.

Gautier schools later reorganized similarly. In 2013, Singing River Elementary was repurposed as Singing River Academy and now holds Gautier's 5th and 6th graders. Students who used to attend Singing River Elementary were split among the three remaining elementary schools in Gautier.

Demographics

2016-17 school year
There were a total of 7,256 students enrolled in the Pascagoula-Gautier School District during the 2016–2017 school year.

Previous school years

Mississippi Succeeds Report Card

Notable people
 Vick Ballard, NFL Running Back
 Hank Bounds, served as Superintendent of the Pascagoula School District and the former President of the University of Nebraska.
 Isaac Brown (basketball), Wichita State University Basketball Coach (Interim)
 Terrell Buckley, NFL Cornerback
 Senquez Golson, NFL Cornerback
 Shane Matthews, NFL Quarterback
 Lynn Thomas, NFL defensive back
 Sarah Thomas, first female NFL referee

See also
List of school districts in Mississippi

References

External links
 

Pascagoula, Mississippi
Education in Jackson County, Mississippi
School districts in Mississippi
School districts established in 1912